The 1998–99 NBA season was the San Antonio Spurs' 32nd season as a franchise, the team's 26th season in San Antonio, and the team's 23rd season in the National Basketball Association. On March 23, 1998, the owners of all 29 NBA teams voted 27–2 to reopen the league's collective bargaining agreement, seeking changes to the league's salary cap system, and a ceiling on individual player salaries. The National Basketball Players Association (NBPA) opposed to the owners' plan, and wanted raises for players who earned the league's minimum salary. After both sides failed to reach an agreement, the owners called for a lockout, which began on July 1, 1998, putting a hold on all team trades, free agent signings and training camp workouts, and cancelling many NBA regular season and preseason games. Due to the lockout, the NBA All-Star Game, which was scheduled to be played in Philadelphia on February 14, 1999, was also cancelled. However, on January 6, 1999, NBA commissioner David Stern, and NBPA director Billy Hunter finally reached an agreement to end the lockout. The deal was approved by both the players and owners, and was signed on January 20, ending the lockout after 204 days. The regular season began on February 5, and was cut short to just 50 games instead of the regular 82-game schedule.

During the off-season, the Spurs acquired second-year guard Antonio Daniels from the Vancouver Grizzlies, and signed free agents Mario Elie, three-point specialist Steve Kerr, and Jerome Kersey. After a promising rookie season from second-year star Tim Duncan, the Spurs got off to a slow start posting a 6–8 record in February. However, in March and April, they won 31 of their final 36 games on their way to a league-best 37–13 season record, roughly equivalent to 61–21 in a full season.

Duncan averaged 21.7 points, 11.4 rebounds and 2.5 blocks per game, and was named to the All-NBA First Team, and to the NBA All-Defensive First Team, while David Robinson averaged 15.8 points, 10.0 rebounds and 2.4 blocks per game. In addition, Sean Elliott provided the team with 11.2 points per game, and Elie and Avery Johnson both contributed 9.7 points per game each, while Johnson led the team with 7.4 assists per game. Duncan also finished in third place in Most Valuable Player voting behind Karl Malone and Alonzo Mourning, and Robinson finished in fourth place in Defensive Player of the Year voting, while Duncan finished tied in fifth place.

In the Western Conference First Round of the playoffs, the Spurs defeated the Minnesota Timberwolves three games to one. In the Western Conference Semi-finals, the Spurs' "Twin Towers" of Duncan and Robinson outplayed Shaquille O'Neal and Kobe Bryant as they swept the Los Angeles Lakers in four straight games. In the Western Conference Finals, the Spurs faced the Portland Trail Blazers. After taking Game 1 with an 80–76 win, the Spurs trailed by 17 points in Game 2. However, the Spurs made a fourth-quarter run that culminated with a game-winning three-pointer from Elliott, as they won 86–85. The Spurs went on to sweep the Trail Blazers in four straight games, becoming the first former American Basketball Association (ABA) team to play in the NBA Finals.

In the Finals, the Spurs defeated the eighth-seeded New York Knicks in five games. Johnson hit the title-winning shot with 47 seconds left to seal the Spurs' first title in franchise history. Duncan was named Finals MVP. Kerr, who previously won three straight championships with the Chicago Bulls, won his fourth consecutive title. Following the season, Will Perdue re-signed as a free agent with his former team, the Chicago Bulls.

Offseason
On June 24, 1998, the Spurs traded Carl Herrera and first-round draft pick Felipe Lopez to the Vancouver Grizzlies for guard Antonio Daniels. The team also signed free agents Mario Elie, Steve Kerr and Jerome Kersey during the offseason.

NBA Draft

Roster

Regular season

Season standings

z - clinched division title
y - clinched division title
x - clinched playoff spot

Record vs. opponents

Game log

Regular season 

|- bgcolor="#ccffcc"
| 1
| February 5
| Sacramento
| 
| Tim Duncan (19)
| Tim Duncan (17)
| Avery Johnson (6)
| Alamodome19,002
| 1–0
|- bgcolor="#ccffcc"
| 2
| February 6
| Minnesota
| 
| Tim Duncan, Sean Elliott (22)
| Tim Duncan (14)
| Avery Johnson (9)
| Alamodome21,319
| 2–0
|- bgcolor="#ffcccc"
| 3
| February 8
| L. A. Lakers
| 
| Tim Duncan (19)
| Tim Duncan (15)
| Mario Elie (6)
| Alamodome33,788
| 2–1
|- bgcolor="#ffcccc"
| 4
| February 9
| @ Minnesota
| 
| David Robinson (16)
| David Robinson, Tim Duncan (11)
| Avery Johnson (10)
| Target Center16,422
| 2–2
|- bgcolor="#ffcccc"
| 5
| February 11
| @ Cleveland
| 
| Tim Duncan (31)
| Tim Duncan (14)
| Avery Johnson (7)
| Gund Arena14,228
| 2–3
|- bgcolor="#ccffcc"
| 6
| February 12
| @ Philadelphia
| 
| Malik Rose (22)
| Malik Rose (9)
| Avery Johnson (5)
| First Union Center16,892
| 3–3
|- bgcolor="#ccffcc"
| 7
| February 14
| @ Chicago
| 
| David Robinson (22)
| Tim Duncan (14)
| Tim Duncan (4)
| United Center22,386
| 4–3
|- bgcolor="#ffcccc"
| 8
| February 17
| Phoenix
| 
| Tim Duncan (20)
| Tim Duncan (12)
| Avery Johnson (7)
| Alamodome16,419
| 4–4
|- bgcolor="#ffcccc"
| 9
| February 19
| @ L. A. Lakers
| 
| Tim Duncan (26)
| Tim Duncan (11)
| Mario Elie (4)
| Great Western Forum17,505
| 4–5
|- bgcolor="#ccffcc"
| 10
| February 21
| Detroit
| 
| Tim Duncan (17)
| Tim Duncan (14)
| Avery Johnson (5)
| Alamodome19,495
| 5–5
|- bgcolor="#ffcccc"
| 11
| February 22
| @ Minnesota
| 
| Avery Johnson (20)
| David Robinson (17)
| Avery Johnson (5)
| Target Center15,374
| 5–6
|- bgcolor="#ccffcc"
| 12
| February 24
| Seattle
| 
| David Robinson (29)
| David Robinson (17)
| Avery Johnson (7)
| Alamodome15,209
| 6–6
|- bgcolor="#ffcccc"
| 13
| February 26
| @ Seattle
| 
| Tim Duncan (22)
| David Robinson (14)
| Avery Johnson (8)
| KeyArena17,072
| 6–7
|- bgcolor="#ffcccc"
| 14
| February 28
| Utah
| 
| Tim Duncan (21)
| Tim Duncan (13)
| Mario Elie (6)
| Alamodome18,165
| 6–8

|- bgcolor="#ccffcc"
| 15
| March 2
| @ Houston
| 
| Tim Duncan (23)
| Tim Duncan (14)
| Avery Johnson (13)
| Compaq Center16,285
| 7–8
|- bgcolor="#ccffcc"
| 16
| March 4
| @ Dallas
| 
| Tim Duncan (26)
| Tim Duncan (12)
| Avery Johnson (10)
| Reunion Arena14,719
| 8–8
|- bgcolor="#ccffcc"
| 17
| March 6
| L. A. Clippers
| 
| Tim Duncan (27)
| David Robinson (10)
| Avery Johnson (10)
| Alamodome18,394
| 9–8
|- bgcolor="#ccffcc"
| 18
| March 7
| @ Denver
| 
| Tim Duncan (34)
| Tim Duncan (13)
| Avery Johnson (14)
| McNichols Sports Arena12,037
| 10–8
|- bgcolor="#ccffcc"
| 19
| March 10
| Orlando
| 
| David Robinson (19)
| Tim Duncan (11)
| Avery Johnson (8)
| Alamodome17,954
| 11–8
|- bgcolor="#ccffcc"
| 20
| March 12
| @ Phoenix
| 
| Tim Duncan (26)
| David Robinson (15)
| Avery Johnson (8)
| America West Arena19,023
| 12–8
|- bgcolor="#ccffcc"
| 21
| March 13
| Denver
| 
| Tim Duncan (27)
| Tim Duncan, Will Perdue (8)
| Avery Johnson (8)
| Alamodome32,982
| 13–8
|- bgcolor="#ccffcc"
| 22
| March 16
| @ Sacramento
| 
| Tim Duncan (29)
| Tim Duncan (12)
| Avery Johnson (15)
| ARCO Arena14,570
| 14–8
|- bgcolor="#ccffcc"
| 23
| March 17
| @ Golden State
| 
| Tim Duncan, Malik Rose (17)
| Tim Duncan (17)
| Avery Johnson (6)
| The Arena in Oakland10,257
| 15–8
|- bgcolor="#ffcccc"
| 24
| March 19
| @ Portland
| 
| Tim Duncan (29)
| Tim Duncan (15)
| Avery Johnson (8)
| Rose Garden Arena20,041
| 15–9
|- bgcolor="#ccffcc"
| 25
| March 20
| @ Vancouver
| 
| Tim Duncan (24)
| Tim Duncan (14)
| Avery Johnson (9)
| General Motors Place19,193
| 16–9
|- bgcolor="#ccffcc"
| 26
| March 23
| Denver
| 
| Tim Duncan (19)
| David Robinson (9)
| Avery Johnson (7)
| Alamodome16,501
| 17–9
|- bgcolor="#ccffcc"
| 27
| March 25
| @ Denver
| 
| Tim Duncan (28)
| David Robinson (13)
| David Robinson (5)
| McNichols Sports Arena10,695
| 18–9
|- bgcolor="#ffcccc"
| 28
| March 26
| Toronto
| 
| David Robinson (24)
| David Robinson (16)
| Avery Johnson (11)
| Alamodome16,290
| 18–10
|- bgcolor="#ccffcc"
| 29
| March 27
| Dallas
| 
| Tim Duncan (21)
| Tim Duncan (15)
| Avery Johnson (8)
| Alamodome25,921
| 19–10
|- bgcolor="#ccffcc"
| 30
| March 30
| Seattle
| 
| Tim Duncan (26)
| David Robinson (10)
| Avery Johnson (9)
| Alamodome16,565
| 20–10

|- bgcolor="#ccffcc"
| 31
| April 1
| Vancouver
| 
| Tim Duncan (39)
| Tim Duncan (13)
| Avery Johnson (8)
| Alamodome16,384
| 21–10
|- bgcolor="#ccffcc"
| 32
| April 3
| L. A. Clippers
| 
| David Robinson, Mario Elie (19)
| David Robinson (13)
| Avery Johnson (8)
| Alamodome17,915
| 22–10
|- bgcolor="#ccffcc"
| 33
| April 5
| Golden State
| 
| David Robinson, Tim Duncan (25)
| David Robinson (16)
| Avery Johnson (4)
| Alamodome14,773
| 23–10
|- bgcolor="#ccffcc"
| 34
| April 8
| @ Houston
| 
| Sean Elliott (19)
| Tim Duncan (13)
| Avery Johnson (10)
| Compaq Center16,285
| 24–10
|- bgcolor="#ffcccc"
| 35
| April 10
| @ Phoenix
| 
| Tim Duncan (21)
| Tim Duncan (10)
| Avery Johnson (6)
| America West Arena19,023
| 24–11
|- bgcolor="#ccffcc"
| 36
| April 12
| Phoenix
| 
| Tim Duncan (26)
| David Robinson (13)
| Tim Duncan, Sean Elliott (4)
| Alamodome14,352
| 25–11
|- bgcolor="#ffcccc"
| 37
| April 13
| @ Dallas
| 
| David Robinson (22)
| Tim Duncan (11)
| Avery Johnson (5)
| Reunion Arena13,142
| 25–12
|- bgcolor="#ccffcc"
| 38
| April 14
| Minnesota
| 
| David Robinson (21)
| David Robinson (15)
| Avery Johnson (6)
| Alamodome15,864
| 26–12
|- bgcolor="#ccffcc"
| 39
| April 16
| Portland
| 
| David Robinson, Tim Duncan (20)
| Tim Duncan (12)
| Avery Johnson (8)
| Alamodome21,368
| 27–12
|- bgcolor="#ccffcc"
| 40
| April 18
| Houston
| 
| Mario Elie (21)
| David Robinson (14)
| Avery Johnson, Tim Duncan (8)
| Alamodome24,077
| 28–12
|- bgcolor="#ccffcc"
| 41
| April 20
| @ Utah
| 
| Tim Duncan (36)
| David Robinson, Malik Rose (11)
| Avery Johnson, Tim Duncan (8)
| Delta Center19,911
| 29–12
|- bgcolor="#ccffcc"
| 42
| April 22
| Dallas
| 
| David Robinson (18)
| Tim Duncan (10)
| Avery Johnson (8)
| Alamodome18,720
| 30–12
|- bgcolor="#ccffcc"
| 43
| April 24
| L. A. Lakers
| 
| Tim Duncan (21)
| Tim Duncan (13)
| Avery Johnson (12)
| Alamodome31,972
| 31–12
|- bgcolor="#ccffcc"
| 44
| April 26
| @ L. A. Clippers
| 
| Tim Duncan (22)
| David Robinson, Jerome Kersey (7)
| Avery Johnson, Tim Duncan (7)
| Los Angeles Memorial Sports Arena8,260
| 32–12
|- bgcolor="#ffcccc"
| 45
| April 27
| @ Sacramento
| 
| Tim Duncan (32)
| Tim Duncan (19)
| Avery Johnson (12)
| ARCO Arena16,776
| 32–13
|- bgcolor="#ccffcc"
| 46
| April 29
| @ Vancouver
| 
| Tim Duncan (19)
| Tim Duncan (10)
| Avery Johnson (8)
| General Motors Place18,448
| 33–13

|- bgcolor="#ccffcc"
| 47
| May 1
| Portland
| 
| David Robinson (26)
| David Robinson, Tim Duncan (12)
| Avery Johnson (8)
| Alamodome28,806
| 34–13
|- bgcolor="#ccffcc"
| 48
| May 2
| Utah
| 
| Tim Duncan (26)
| Tim Duncan (14)
| Avery Johnson (3)
| Alamodome35,122
| 35–13
|- bgcolor="#ccffcc"
| 49
| May 4
| @ Portland
| 
| David Robinson (29)
| David Robinson (12)
| Tim Duncan, Avery Johnson (6)
| Rose Garden Arena20,715
| 36–13
|- bgcolor="#ccffcc"
| 50
| May 5
| @ Golden State
| 
| Tim Duncan (28)
| David Robinson (20)
| Sean Elliott (6)
| The Arena in Oakland17,235
| 37–13

Playoffs

|- align="center" bgcolor="#ccffcc"
| 1
| May 9
| Minnesota
| W 99–86
| Tim Duncan (26)
| Tim Duncan (12)
| Avery Johnson (10)
| Alamodome22,356
| 1–0
|- align="center" bgcolor="#ffcccc"
| 2
| May 11
| Minnesota
| L 71–80
| Tim Duncan (18)
| Tim Duncan (16)
| Mario Elie (4)
| Alamodome22,494
| 1–1
|- align="center" bgcolor="#ccffcc"
| 3
| May 13
| @ Minnesota
| W 85–71
| Avery Johnson (24)
| David Robinson (18)
| Duncan, Robinson (7)
| Target Center17,444
| 2–1
|- align="center" bgcolor="#ccffcc"
| 4
| May 15
| @ Minnesota
| W 92–85
| David Robinson (19)
| David Robinson (11)
| Avery Johnson (6)
| Target Center15,898
| 3–1
|-

|- align="center" bgcolor="#ccffcc"
| 1
| May 17
| L.A. Lakers
| W 87–81
| Tim Duncan (25)
| Will Perdue (9)
| Avery Johnson (8)
| Alamodome25,297
| 1–0
|- align="center" bgcolor="#ccffcc"
| 2
| May 19
| L.A. Lakers
| W 79–76
| Tim Duncan (21)
| Tim Duncan (8)
| Avery Johnson (10)
| Alamodome33,293
| 2–0
|- align="center" bgcolor="#ccffcc"
| 3
| May 22
| @ L.A. Lakers
| W 103–91
| Tim Duncan (37)
| Tim Duncan (14)
| Avery Johnson (7)
| Great Western Forum17,505
| 3–0
|- align="center" bgcolor="#ccffcc"
| 4
| May 23
| @ L.A. Lakers
| W 118–107
| Tim Duncan (33)
| Tim Duncan (14)
| Avery Johnson (10)
| Great Western Forum17,505
| 4–0
|- 

|- align="center" bgcolor="#ccffcc"
| 1
| May 29
| Portland
| W 80–76
| Duncan, Robinson (21)
| Tim Duncan (13)
| Avery Johnson (9)
| Alamodome35,165
| 1–0
|- align="center" bgcolor="#ccffcc"
| 2
| May 31
| Portland
| W 86–85
| Tim Duncan (23)
| Tim Duncan (10)
| Avery Johnson (7)
| Alamodome35,260
| 2–0
|- align="center" bgcolor="#ccffcc"
| 3
| June 4
| @ Portland
| W 85–63
| Jaren Jackson (19)
| David Robinson (9)
| Avery Johnson (8)
| Rose Garden20,732
| 3–0
|- align="center" bgcolor="#ccffcc"
| 4
| June 6
| @ Portland
| W 94–80
| David Robinson (20)
| David Robinson (10)
| Avery Johnson (6)
| Rose Garden20,735
| 4–0
|-

|- align="center" bgcolor="#ccffcc"
| 1
| June 16
| New York
| W 89–77
| Tim Duncan (33)
| Tim Duncan (16)
| Avery Johnson (8)
| Alamodome39,514
| 1–0
|- align="center" bgcolor="#ccffcc"
| 2
| June 18
| New York
| W 80–67
| Tim Duncan (25)
| Tim Duncan (15)
| Avery Johnson (5)
| Alamodome39,554
| 2–0
|- align="center" bgcolor="#ffcccc"
| 3
| June 21
| @ New York
| L 81–89
| David Robinson (25)
| Tim Duncan (12)
| Avery Johnson (4)
| Madison Square Garden19,763
| 2–1
|- align="center" bgcolor="#ccffcc"
| 4
| June 23
| @ New York
| W 96–89
| Tim Duncan (28)
| Tim Duncan (18)
| Avery Johnson (10)
| Madison Square Garden19,763
| 3–1
|- align="center" bgcolor="#ccffcc"
| 5
| June 25
| @ New York
| W 78–77
| Tim Duncan (31)
| David Robinson (12)
| Avery Johnson (9)
| Madison Square Garden19,763
| 4–1
|-

Player stats

Regular season

Playoffs

NBA Finals
The 1999 NBA Finals saw some firsts for both the Spurs and the opposing New York Knicks.

The Spurs:
Became the first former ABA team to play and win in an NBA Finals.
Attracted record crowds for the two games at the Alamodome.  Attendance was 39,514 for Game 1 and 39,554 for Game 2 (the largest crowd to see an NBA Finals game).
Steve Kerr became the first non-Celtic to win four straight championships, as he won titles with the Bulls from 1996 to 1998.
The Knicks became the first (and to this date, the only) 8th seed to ever play in an NBA Finals.

Summary
The following scoring summary is written in a line score format, except that the quarter numbers are replaced by game numbers.

With time running out in Game 5, and the 1999 championship on the line, the Spurs looked to Avery Johnson as he hit a long clutch 2 from the corner with 47 seconds to go, giving the Spurs a 1-point lead. It was considered one of the franchise's best moments since the first 26 years in San Antonio.

Schedule
Game 1 - June 16, Wednesday   @San Antonio, San Antonio 89, New York 77: San Antonio leads series 1-0
Game 2 - June 18, Friday   @San Antonio, San Antonio 80, New York 67: San Antonio leads series 2-0
Game 3 - June 21, Monday  @New York, New York 89, San Antonio 81: San Antonio leads series 2-1
Game 4 - June 23, Wednesday @New York,  San Antonio 96, New York 89: San Antonio leads series 3-1
Game 5 - June 25, Friday @New York,  San Antonio 78, New York 77: San Antonio wins series 4-1

The Finals were played using a 2-3-2 site format, where the first two and last two games are held at the team with home court advantage. The NBA, after experimenting in the early years, restored this original format for the Finals in 1985. So far, the other playoff series are still running on a 2-2-1-1-1 site format.

Award winners
Tim Duncan, Forward, All-NBA First Team
Tim Duncan, Forward, All-NBA Defensive First Team
Tim Duncan, Forward, NBA Finals MVP

References

 San Antonio Spurs on Database Basketball
 San Antonio Spurs on Basketball Reference

San Antonio Spurs seasons
Western Conference (NBA) championship seasons
NBA championship seasons
San
San Antonio
San Antonio